The Swiss mini gun, produced in Switzerland by SwissMiniGun, is considered the world's smallest working revolver. The revolver measures 5.5 cm long, 3.5 cm tall and 1 cm wide, weighing only 19.8g. Ammunition is 2.34mm rimfire, also produced by SwissMiniGun. There is a key ring holster that comes with the gun when it is bought and can be clipped to a belt loop. Many countries, including the United States and the United Kingdom, forbid the importation of the Swiss Mini Gun due to the ease of concealing the revolver.

SwissMiniGun is recognized by Guinness World Records as making the world's smallest working revolver, their model C1ST. It is a double-action revolver and has all the same features as are found on normal-sized revolvers. The manufacturer's website claims that it was manufactured using techniques from the Swiss watch and jewelry industries.

References 

Revolvers of Switzerland